Kondarangi Keeranur known as K Keeranur is a panchayat located in Oddanchatram Tk, Dindigul Dt., Tamil Nadu, India. Village is a multi caste one with a population of 5000. Kondarangi Keeranur panchayat have eight hamlets namely Vellianvalasu, Perumal Goundan Valasu, Chinnakaliappa Goundan Valasu, Idayan Valasu, Cherian Nagar, Miras Nagar, Maleeswarapuram and Anna Nagar. The main activity of the village is Agriculture. Current Panchayat president is Mrs.Vijayalakshmi shanmugasundar, DMK who is well known personality in Oddanchatram Taluk. Panchayat won Uthamar Gandhi Award of the year 2006.

Location/Map 
North by Mulanur in Tiruppur District, South by Oddanchatram, Taluk Headquarters, West by Kallimandayam and East by Idayakottai and connected by State High ways roads.

Temples 
K Keeranur has five temples, namely,
 Mallikarjuna Swamy Temple (Kondarangi Hills) [well known famous temple, celebrated in Chithirai Pournami, Maha Shivaratri]
 Mayavan temple [ Naayakar's are main devotees]
 Kaliamman temple
 Vinayagar temple
 Mandha pidari temple

Water Facilities 
The panchayat have overhead tanks, mini pumps, ground level reservoirs and also hand pumps for water supply. Every hamlet is connected with overhead tanks with sufficient power supply. House connections are also given to most of the houses. More than 100 public tapes are provided for water supply.

Schools 
K Keeranur has one middle school-Panchayat Union Higher Elementary School)s and hamlets have 3 elementary schools.

Bank / ATM 
Canara Bank with ATM

Hospital 
Primary Health Centre with MBBS, BDS & Homeopathic Doctors

Medicals 
Totally 1 medical shop available.
 Prakash medicals

Cellphone Towers 
Most of the mobile network companies installed towers to cover signals with near by 5 villages.
 Vodafone
 Airtel (with 4G service)
Jio (with 4G service)

Specialties 
Total Sanitation village
Families adopt family planning in letter and spirit. Most of them have one child (who are below 50 years) and others maximum of two children.

References

 https://kkeeranur.com
 https://kondarangihills.com

Panchayat President 
Mrs.vijayalakshmi shanmugasundar

Villages in Dindigul district